Sharaf DG (formerly Al Fahidi) is a rapid transit station on the Green Line of the Dubai Metro in Dubai, UAE.

Location

Located at the edge of the historic core of Dubai, Sharaf DG station lies underneath the intersection of Khalid bin Waleed Road and Al Mankhool Road. Nearby attractions include the Grand Mosque, the Dubai Museum, and numerous hotels. It is also close to Al Seef (with a Marina Transport Station on Dubai Creek), the Old Textile Souk, and the Sheikh Mohammed Centre for Cultural Understanding.

History
Sharaf DG station was renamed from Al Fahidi on 24 November 2020. Mashreq station was formerly called Sharaf DG until 18 May 2020.

Sharaf DG station opened along with the initial stretch of the Green Line on 9 September 2011, with trains running from Creek to Etisalat. In December 2012, the RTA announced that Al Fahidi saw the highest ridership of all Green Line stations since opening in 2011, with 5.232 million passengers.

Station layout
As with other stations in Dubai's historic centre, Sharaf DG is an underground station, with tracks and platforms situated below Kalid bin Waleed Road. There are two side platforms and two tracks, with access to the station from all four corners of Khalid bin Waleed Road's intersection with Al Mankhool Road. Sharaf DG's colour scheme is characterised by the use of bright red tiles, symbolising the element of fire; other Dubai Metro stations take inspiration from fire as well as air, water and earth.

Platform layout

References

External links
 My Dubai Metro

Railway stations in the United Arab Emirates opened in 2011
Dubai Metro stations